Velo or Vélo may refer to:
 A bicycle, a two-wheeled, single-track vehicle

People 
 , Danish footballer
 Carlos Velo (1909–1988), Spanish film director
 Christian Nestor Velo, Malagasy politician
 Marco Velo (born 1974), Italian cyclist
 Michael Velo (1851–1929), Norwegian businessperson and politician
 Steljano Velo (born 1996), Albanian footballer

Publications 
 Le Vélo, French sports newspaper
 Vélo Magazine, an Éditions Philippe Amaury publication

Other uses 
 Velo, Greece, a town in Greece
 Velo, Nicotine salt product
 VeloBind, binding
 Benz Velo, automobile
 Philips Velo, handheld PC
 Velo-, prefix form of velum (soft palate), such as in velocardiofacial syndrome

See also